Rui Pedro Godinho Cordeiro (born 14 October 1976) is a Portuguese former rugby union footballer. He played as a prop. He has a degree in veterinary medicine.

Cordeiro played for Académica de Coimbra. He won the National II Division title in 1998-99 and 2006–07, and the National I Division title in 2003-04.

He had 44 caps for the Portugal national team, from 2002 to 2007, having scored 2 tries, 10 points in aggregate.

He was a member of the Portugal squad at the 2007 Rugby World Cup, and played in all four games. He was one of the heaviest players of the competition, with 138 kg. He scored Portugal's only try in their 108-13 loss to New Zealand on 15 September 2007. The try was particularly memorable for the Portuguese because it was achieved in a maul with the All Blacks.

He announced that he was leaving the National Team and the competition after the tournament.

External links
Rui Cordeiro International Statistics

1976 births
Living people
People from Figueira da Foz
Portuguese rugby union players
Rugby union props
Portugal international rugby union players
Sportspeople from Coimbra District